Tessy Bamberg-Schitter (born 20 June 1980) is a Luxembourgian football midfielder who has played for the Luxembourg women's national team and FC Cebra 01.

References

1980 births
Living people
Luxembourgian women's footballers
Luxembourg women's international footballers
Women's association football midfielders